APBL2000 is the second live concert album by Apoptygma Berzerk containing live recordings from their "Welcome To Earth Tour". It was released on July 31, 2001 through Metropolis Records in the US, and Warner Music Group in Europe. Live footage of the tour is available on DVD and VHS.

Track listing

Personnel 

 Stephan Groth (STP) (Grothesk) – vocals, programming, guitars and everything
 Fredrik Darum – producer, live guitarist
 Ted Skogmann – drums and guitar
 Geir Bratland – keyboard, backing vocals

References

Apoptygma Berzerk albums
2001 live albums